Afraflacilla imitator is a jumping spider species in the genus Afraflacilla that lives in South Africa. It was first described in 2013.

References

Endemic fauna of South Africa
Salticidae
Spiders described in 2013
Spiders of South Africa
Taxa named by Wanda Wesołowska